Keep 'Em Rolling is a 1934 American drama film, directed by George Archainbaud from a screenplay by Albert Shelby Le Vino and F. McGrew Willis.  It starred Walter Huston and Frances Dee and the men of the US Army 16th Field Artillery. Filmed partially at Fort Myer, VA, during WW I, the story revolves around the field artillery horse named Rodney and his soldier, Benny Walsh (played by Walter Huston). The movie is based on the short story "Rodney" written by Leonard Hastings Nason that appeared on January 21, 1933, issue of the Saturday Evening Post magazine.

References

External links

1934 films
1934 drama films
American drama films
American black-and-white films
Films about horses
Films directed by George Archainbaud
RKO Pictures films
American World War I films
1930s English-language films
1930s American films